The Bloomington Viaduct spans the Northern Branch of the Potomac River connecting Bloomington, Maryland to Mineral County, West Virginia. The sandstone railroad bridge features three full center arches, each with a 56-foot (17 m) span and a 28-foot (8.5 m) rise. It is owned and operated by CSX Transportation on its Mountain Subdivision.

History

When built in 1851, it carried a double track of the original Baltimore and Ohio Railroad main line. In 1916 the viaduct was widened to accommodate two more tracks. The addition is a Melan-type reinforced concrete bridge of identical configuration built against the south face of the original stone bridge. As the state boundary follows the southern bank of the Potomac, nearly all of the bridge is located in Garrett County, Maryland.

The Bloomington Viaduct was listed on the National Register of Historic Places on November 21, 1976.

References

External links
, including photo in 1975, at Maryland Historical Trust

Baltimore and Ohio Railroad bridges
CSX Transportation bridges
Railroad bridges on the National Register of Historic Places in Maryland
Railroad bridges on the National Register of Historic Places in West Virginia
Bridges completed in 1851
Railroad bridges in Maryland
Railroad bridges in West Virginia
Deck arch bridges in the United States
Buildings and structures in Garrett County, Maryland
Buildings and structures in Mineral County, West Virginia
Stone bridges in the United States
Stone arch bridges in the United States
Viaducts in the United States
Transportation in Garrett County, Maryland
Transportation in Mineral County, West Virginia
1851 establishments in Maryland
National Register of Historic Places in Garrett County, Maryland
Concrete bridges in the United States
1851 establishments in Virginia